George Edmund Price was the Democratic President of the West Virginia Senate from Mineral County and served from 1885 to 1889.

References

Presidents of the West Virginia State Senate
Democratic Party West Virginia state senators
People from Keyser, West Virginia
1848 births
1938 deaths
People from Moorefield, West Virginia
Politicians from Charleston, West Virginia
West Virginia lawyers
Lawyers from Charleston, West Virginia